At least 223 companies have manufactured hard disk drives.  Most of that industry has vanished through bankruptcy or mergers and acquisitions. None of the first four entrants continue in the industry today.  Only three manufacturers have survived: Seagate, Toshiba and Western Digital (WD)—all of which grew at least in part through mergers and acquisitions.

Partial list of defunct manufacturers
Some of the defunct manufacturers include:

 Alps America
 Amcodyne
 Ampex
 Anelex Corp.
 Areal Technology – acquired by Tomen Corp in 1993
 Atasi Technology, Inc.
 Aura Associates
 Avatar Systems
 BASF
 Brand Technologies
 Bryant Computer Products
 Bull
 Burroughs Corporation – merged with Sperry Corporation to form Unisys in 1986
 C. Itoh Electronics
 Castlewood Systems
 Caelus Memories|Caelus Memories, Inc.
 CalComp
 Calluna Technologies
 Cardiff
 Century Data
 Cogito
 Comport
 Computer Memories Inc. (CMI) – left industry in 1986
 Computer Memory Devices, Inc.
 Conner Peripherals – merged with Seagate in 1996
 Control Data Corporation (CDC) / Imprimis Technology – sold hard disk drive business to Seagate in 1989
 Cornice LLC – bankrupt in 2007
 Data General
 Data Products Corp.
 Data Recording Instruments (DRI)
 Data Tech Memories
 Diablo Systems - became Diablo Data Systems in 1972
 Digital Equipment Corporation (DEC) – sold hard disk drive business to Quantum Corporation in 1994
 Disc Tech One
 Disctron
 DMA
 DZU (of Bulgaria) – converted from government-owned to private, and sold to Videoton in 1999
 Ecol. 2
 Emulex
 Epson
 Espert
 ExcelStor Technology – left industry
 Fuji Electric
 Fujitsu – HDD division acquired by Toshiba in July 2009
 General Electric (GE)
 Gigastorage
 GS Magicstor, Inc. – manufacturing 1-inch drives
 Hewlett-Packard (HP) - 1976 to 1996, left industry
 Hitachi Global Storage Technologies (HGST) – 2002 merger of Hitachi and IBM disk drive businesses, sold to Western Digital in 2012 with part of 3.5″ manufacturing facilities going to Toshiba
 Hokushin Electric Works
 Honeywell Bull
 Hyosung
 IBM – hard disk drive business acquired by Hitachi Global Storage Technologies in 2002
 Information Storage Systems Acquired by Itel, then Univac and finally CDC
 Integral Peripherals – first rigid 1.8" drive; bankrupt in 1998
 International Memories, Inc.(IMI) Discontinued manufacturing in early 1985.
 Iomec
 Iomega – left industry
 ISOT/ИЗОТ (of Bulgaria)
 Josephine County Technology (JCT) Ceased manufacturing in 1988.
 JT Storage (JTS) – bankrupt in 1999
 JVC – left industry
 Kalok – bankrupt in 1994
 Kyocera Electronics, Inc
 LaPine Technologies
 Librascope
 Marshall Laboratories
 Matsushita - left industry in 2004, its final production was exclusive for Quantum Corporation and then Maxtor
 Maxtor – acquired by Seagate in 2006
 Memorex – acquired by Burroughs 1981 and then merged into Unisys 1986; HDD division shut down in 1988
 Microcomputer Memories – Chapter 7 bancrutpcy in 1987
 Micropolis Corporation – bankrupt in 1997
 Microscience International – bankrupt in 1992
 MiniScribe – bankrupt and then acquired by Maxtor in 1990
 Ministor Peripherals – first mobile 1.8" drive; bankrupt in 1998
 Mitsubishi – left industry
 Mitsumi Electronics Corporation
 NCR Corporation
 NEC – left industry
 Newberry Data
 Nippon Electric Industry Co. Ltd. (NEI) AKA as Densei in Japan was 34.5% owned by NEC.  Stopped manufacturing HDDs in December 1986.  
 Nippon Peripherals, Limited (NPL) 
 Nomaï
 Okidata
 Olivetti
 Orca Technology Corporation
 Otari 1982-1986
 Pertec Computer
 Philips
 Plus Development – Subsidiary of Quantum; created Hardcard; absorbed back into Quantum 1992
 Potter Instrument
 PrairieTek – first 2.5" rigid HDD; bankrupt in 1991
 Priam Corporation – 1978–1989, became Priam Systems Corporation in 1990 and sold product line to Prima International in 1991
 Peripheral Technology, Inc (PTI)
 Quantum Corporation – sold hard disk drive business to Maxtor in 2001
 Raymond Engineering
 Ricoh
 Rodime – first 3.5" rigid HDD; shut down manufacturing in 1991; licensed its patents until the patent business was sold for $1.5M in July 2003. The company was then the subject of a reverse merger and became Sportech PLC.
 Rotating Memory Systems, Inc. (RMS) Acquired by CCT in 1982 
 Sagem
 Samsung – HDD business acquired by Seagate for $1.4 billion in 2011
 Seiko Epson
 Sequel - spin out of Memorex in 1988
 Shugart Associates – Acquired by Xerox in 1977 and shut down in 1986.
 Siemens
 Sony
 Storage Technology Corporation (StorageTek or STK) – left industry
 SyQuest Technology – bankrupt in 1998; some patents acquired by Iomega. Re-emerged selling cartridges for their previously discontinued products.
 Tandon Corporation – acquired by Western Digital in 1988
 Teac America, Inc.
 Texas Instruments
 Tokico
 Tulin Corporation – bankrupt
 Vertex Peripherals – acquired by Priam Corporation in 1985
 Xebec – Xebec's 1410 SCSI controller formed the basis of IBM PC's hard disk controller.
 YE-Data

See also
 History of hard disk drives
 List of computer hardware manufacturers
 List of hard disk manufacturers
 List of solid-state drive manufacturers

Notes

References

Further reading
 

  - lists 126 HDD manufacturers including 3 current ones.

Hard-disk manufacturers

Defunct hard-disk manufacturers
Defunct hard-disk manufacturers
Hard disk
Hard disk